A total lunar eclipse will take place on Saturday, January 31, 2037. The Moon will be plunged into darkness for 1 hour and 3 minutes 41 seconds, in a moderately deep total eclipse which will see the Moon 20.74% of its diameter inside the Earth's umbral shadow. The visual effect of this depends on the state of the Earth's atmosphere, but the Moon may be stained a deep red colour for observers in north and west North America, most of Asia, Australia and New Zealand. The partial eclipse will last for 3 hours and 17 minutes 28 seconds in total. It occurs during a supermoon (perigee), and blue moon (second full moon of month), just like the eclipse of January 31, 2018, one metonic cycle (19 years) previous.

Visibility

Related lunar eclipses

Lunar year series

See also
List of lunar eclipses and List of 21st-century lunar eclipses

Notes

External links

2037-01
2037-01
2037 in science